A Street Cat Named Sylvester is a 1953 Warner Bros. Looney Tunes animated short directed by Friz Freleng. The short was released on September 5, 1953, and stars Tweety and Sylvester.

The title is a play on A Streetcar Named Desire, a play later made into a film.

Plot
Tweety stumbles into Sylvester's house looking for shelter and Sylvester hesitates, wondering if he saw a tweety bird in the same manner Tweety wonders if he saw a 'Putty Tat'. Sylvester snatches him inside but has to hide Tweety in a vase covered by books when Granny appears. While Hector remains bedridden, having injured himself while chasing Sylvester, the cat causes whatever diversion he can to stop Granny from spotting Tweety, making Granny give multiple doses of medicine to him. Despite the injury, Hector keeps getting in Sylvester's way from eating Tweety, saying he'll have to get him over his dead body. Sylvester tries to arrange that by dropping a refrigerator on top of Hector,  but he miscalculates his aim and the fridge falls on him instead. Now, with Sylvester having injured himself from the refrigerator accident and being bedridden with Hector, Tweety spikes Hector's medicine resulting in Sylvester ingesting the disgusting stuff, leaving him in "awful predicament when that medicine kicks in".

Home media
The cartoon is available on the "Sylvester and Tweety's Tale Feathers" VHS.

References

1953 films
1953 short films
1953 animated films
1950s English-language films
1950s Warner Bros. animated short films
American animated short films
Looney Tunes shorts
Sylvester the Cat films
Tweety films
Animated films about dogs
Short films directed by Friz Freleng
Films scored by Carl Stalling
Warner Bros. Cartoons animated short films